The 1871 Grand National was the 33rd renewal of the Grand National horse race that took place at Aintree near Liverpool, England, on 21 March 1871.

Finishing Order

Non-finishers

References

 1871
Grand National
Grand National
19th century in Lancashire
March 1871 sports events